Badhauna (Hindi: बढ़ौना) is a village in Pindra Tehsil of Varanasi district in the Indian state of Uttar Pradesh. The village falls under gram panchayat by the same name as the village.

Demography
Badhauna has 315 families with the total population of 2,306. Sex ratio of the village is 1,064 and child sex ratio is 930. Uttar Pradesh state average for both ratios is 912 and 902 respectively .

Transportation
Badhauna is connected by air (Lal Bahadur Shastri Airport), train (Babatpur railway station) and by road. The nearest operational airports are Varanasi airport ( south) and Allahabad Airports ( west).

See also
Pindra Tehsil
Pindra (Assembly constituency)

Notes
  All demographic data is based on 2011 Census of India.

References 

Villages in Varanasi district